Dichomeris minutia is a moth in the family Gelechiidae. It was described by Kyu-Tek Park in 1994. It is found in Korea.

The length of the forewings is 3.5-4.5 mm. The forewings are pale ochreous, with scattered dark brown scales and three distinct dark brown discal spots. The hindwings are pale grey.

References

Moths described in 1994
minutia